Selvam Suresh Kumar (born 20 March 1985 in Chennai, Tamil Nadu, India) is an Indian cricketer, currently representing Madras Cricket Club in Tamil Nadu Cricket Association's 1st Division League, and Puducherry in the Ranji Trophy.  He formerly represented Chennai Super Kings in the Indian Premier League and Tamil Nadu in all other Indian domestic cricket. He is an all-rounder who bats right-handed and bowls right-arm off spin.

Career 
Suresh Kumar made his debut in first-class cricket for Tamil Nadu against a Sri Lanka Cricket Invitational XI in September 2007, and his List A cricket debut against Madhya Pradesh in April 2008. He was signed up by Chennai Super Kings for the 2009 season of the Indian Premier League.

Notes

External links
 Suresh Kumar profile at Cricinfo
 Suresh Kumar profile at CricketArchive

1985 births
Living people
Indian cricketers
Chennai Super Kings cricketers
Tamil Nadu cricketers
India Blue cricketers
Pondicherry cricketers